Coccothrinax readii, the Mexican silver palm, is a palm which is native to southeastern Mexico and northeastern Belize.

Henderson and colleagues (1995) considered C. readii to be a synonym of Coccothrinax argentata.

References

readii
Trees of Mexico
Plants described in 1980
Trees of Belize